James Stephen Smith (born 30 April 1963) is a Scottish-born Canadian former professional ice hockey defenceman and former assistant coach of the Buffalo Sabres, Carolina Hurricanes and Edmonton Oilers. He played in the National Hockey League (NHL) from 1984–85 to 2000–01 and coached from 2010-11 to 2020-21. Currently Smith is an assistant coach with the Hartford Wolfpack of the American Hockey League (AHL). Smith played in the 1991 All-Star game in Chicago and was part of the 1991 Canadian Team to win the Canada Cup in Toronto. Smith grew up in Cobourg, Ontario (also home of former NHL player Justin Williams) and has two brothers David and Ian.

Playing career
Smith played for the London Knights of the Ontario Hockey League from 1980-81 to 1982-83 before being drafted by the Edmonton Oilers in the 1981 NHL Entry Draft in the 6th round, 111th overall. He spent his first 2 years of professional hockey (1983-84 to 1984-85) playing for the Oilers minor league affiliate teams (Moncton and Halifax). He played with the Oilers starting in the 1984/85 season. He went on to play 804 career games scoring 375 points (72-303-375) along with 2139 penalty minutes. Smith also played in 134 Stanley Cup Playoff games, scoring 52 points (11-41-52).

Smith played for the Oilers until the end of the 1990–91 season, winning three Stanley Cups with the team. He then played for the Chicago Blackhawks until 1997. He announced his retirement due to injury following the 1996–97 season, but made a comeback 1998-99 playing parts of three seasons with the Flames, retiring for good in December 2000.

Coaching career
Smith was an assistant coach with the Flames in 1997–98. He worked as a scout with the Chicago Blackhawks prior to spending four seasons on the Oilers coaching staff from 2010 to 2014. He was hired as an assistant coach of the Hurricanes in June 2014, then as the assistant coach of the Sabres in July 2018. Smith, along with head coach Ralph Krueger were relieved of their duties by the Sabres on 17 March 2021. He now works with the New York Rangers minor league affiliate team the Hartford Wolfpack as an assistant coach.

Personal life
Smith was born in Glasgow, Scotland, United Kingdom, but grew up in Cobourg, Ontario.

He is married and has five children.  His son, Barron Smith (born 2 April 1991), was selected by the Toronto Maple Leafs in the 7th round of the 2009 NHL Entry Draft.

Awards
1986–87 – NHL – Stanley Cup (Edmonton)
1987–88 – NHL – Stanley Cup (Edmonton)
1989–90 – NHL – Stanley Cup (Edmonton)

Career statistics

Regular season and playoffs

International

See also
List of National Hockey League players born in the United Kingdom
List of NHL players with 2,000 career penalty minutes

References

External links

Video of the own-goal

1963 births
Brantford Alexanders players
Buffalo Sabres coaches
Calgary Flames captains
Calgary Flames coaches
Calgary Flames players
Canadian ice hockey coaches
Canadian ice hockey defencemen
Carolina Hurricanes coaches
Chicago Blackhawks players
Chicago Blackhawks scouts
Edmonton Oilers coaches
Edmonton Oilers draft picks
Edmonton Oilers players
Living people
London Knights players
Moncton Alpines (AHL) players
National Hockey League All-Stars
Nova Scotia Oilers players
Scottish emigrants to Canada
Sportspeople from Glasgow
Sportspeople from London, Ontario
Stanley Cup champions
Canadian expatriate ice hockey players in the United States